Slog's Dad is a 2006 short story by David Almond and is about a boy called Slog who, sees a man he believes is his father returned from death to visit him.  It was originally published in a collection of short stories and subsequently released, in 2010, as a stand-alone graphic novel illustrated by Dave McKean.

Publication history
Slog's Dad appeared in the following publications:
So, what kept you?: new stories inspired by Anton Chekhov and Raymond Carver, Claire Malcolm and Margaret Wilkinson, Flambard Press/New Writing North 2006, England, paperback
The National Short Story Prize 2007 2007, England, Atlantic , paperback

before being published as a stand-alone graphic novel:
Slog's Dad 2010, England, Walker Books , hardback
Slog's Dad 2011, USA, Candlewick Press , hardback

Reception
A Booktrust review of Slog's Dad called it "A poignant and sensitive story of grief and loss".
Publishers Weekly in a starred review wrote "Another haunting and beautiful book from the U.K. team that produced The Savage in 2008." and "The volume is richly and poetically illustrated by McKean."

It has also been reviewed by Booklist, the School Library Journal, the Horn Book, Voice of Youth Advocates.

Awards and nominations
2007 BBC National Short Story Award - finalist
2012 Kate Greenaway Medal - shortlist

References

2010 British novels
2010 graphic novels
British young adult novels
British graphic novels
Novels about death
British short stories
2006 short stories
Walker Books books